Poeketi Airstrip  is an airstrip serving Poeketi, Suriname.

Charter airlines and destinations 
Charter Airlines serving this airport are:

See also

 List of airports in Suriname
 Transport in Suriname

References

External links
OpenStreetMap - Poeketi

Airports in Suriname